A Portrait of the Artist as a Young Man is a 1977 film adaptation of James Joyce's 1916 novel of the same name, directed by Joseph Strick. It portrays the growth of consciousness of Joyce's semi-autobiographical character, Stephen Dedalus, as a boy and later as a university student in late nineteenth-century Dublin.

Cast

 Bosco Hogan – Stephen Dedalus
 T. P. McKenna – Simon Dedalus
 John Gielgud – The Preacher
 Rosaleen Linehan – Mary (May) Dedalus
 Maureen Potter – Mrs. Dante Riordan
 Niall Buggy – Davin
 Bryan Murray – Lynch
 Desmond Cave – Cranly
 Leslie Lalor – Milly
 Desmond Perry – John Casey
 Susan Fitzgerald – Emma Daniels
 Luke Johnston – Stephen Dedalus, age ten
 Danny Figgis – Wells
 Cecil Sheehan – Uncle Charles
 Edward Golden – Father Conmee
 Bill Foley – Confessor
 David Kelly – Dean of Studies
 Edward Byrne – Teacher
 Emmet Bergin – Father Dolan
 Aiden Grennell – Father Arnall
 Danny Cummins – Drinker
 Chris Curran – Auctioneer
 Brendan Cauldwell – Father Michael
 Eamon Kelly
 Anna Manahan
 Maureen Toal
 Jacinta Martin
 Chris O'Neill
 Brenda Doyle
 Deirdre Donnelly

Children

 Dominic Burdick
 Gray Burdick
 Linus Burdick
 Ashling Burdick
 Lucy Burdick
 Katy Burdick
 Tiernan Quinn
 Sean Pilkington
 Kenneth Joyce
 Joan Hayes
 John Hayes
 James Lennon
 Ronan Donelan
 Ian Branagan
 Terence Strick – Stephen Dedalus, age three (uncredited)
 Helen Strick

References

Further reading

External links
 
 
 

1977 films
Irish drama films
1977 drama films
Films based on Irish novels
Films directed by Joseph Strick
Films scored by Stanley Myers
Films set in Dublin (city)
Films shot in the Republic of Ireland
Films shot in County Kildare
1970s English-language films